Franklin D. Roosevelt State Park is a  state park in Westchester County, New York. The park was created in 1922 on the former site of the Mohansic State Hospital.

The park includes two water bodies, Mohansic Lake and Crom Pond.

History
The state first acquired the park land between 1909 and 1922. The land south of Crom Pond and Mohansic Lake was acquired in 1908 for the New York State Training School for Boys. North of Crom Pond and Mohansic Lake was acquired in 1909 by the State Hospital Commission. There was concern that having a hospital so close to the New Croton Reservoir would pollute the watershed. This helped Westchester County acquire the entire park in 1922.

In 1923, Westchester County grew over 20,000 specimens of pine, spruce and evergreen trees on the park grounds for transplantation to other Westchester parks. During the Great Depression, a Civilian Conservation Corps camp was placed in the park, several buildings from which remain today. New York State acquired the property in 1957. It was renamed Franklin D. Roosevelt State Park in 1982.

Park facilities
Franklin D. Roosevelt State Park prominently features a large swimming pool with the capacity to hold 3,500 bathers at one time. The park also offers biking, a boat launch and rentals, disc golf, fishing, ice skating, picnic tables and pavilions, a playground and playing fields, recreation programs, trails for hiking, jogging, snowmobiling and cross-country skiing, and a food concession. Fishing and boating is available on both Crom Pond and Mohansic Lake.

See also
 Donald J. Trump State Park
 List of New York state parks

References

External links
 New York State Parks: Franklin D. Roosevelt State Park
 Friends of FDR State Park

Yorktown, New York
State parks of New York (state)
Civilian Conservation Corps in New York (state)
Parks in Westchester County, New York
Monuments and memorials to Franklin D. Roosevelt in the United States